A Border Security Zone in Russia is the designation of a strip of land (usually, though not always, along a Russian external border) where economic activity and access are restricted in line with the Frontier Regime Regulations set by the Federal Security Service (FSB). For foreign tourists to visit the zone a permit issued by the local FSB department is required.

In 1935–1936, in order to secure the western border of the Soviet Union, many nationalities considered unreliable (Poles, Germans, Ingrian Finns, Estonians, Latvians) were forcibly transferred from the zone by forces of NKVD.

After the dissolution of the Soviet Union in 1991, the borders of the new Russian Federation were dramatically different, but the zone was not corrected accordingly and hence effectively ceased to exist. In 1993, the Law on the State Border was adopted and reestablished a border strip with restricted access, which should not exceed  (although in fact it became much wider in some places). In 2004 the law was amended, the 5 km restriction was removed, and the FSB was legally authorized to draw the zone's limits on its own without coordination with local authorities. In 2006 FSB Director Nikolay Patrushev and his deputy Sergei Smirnov issued decrees delimiting the zone, which expanded greatly and included many large settlements, important transport routes and resort areas, especially in the Republic of Karelia, Leningrad Oblast, and Primorsky Krai. In 2007, pressured by the public, FSB curtailed the zone in some places.

See also 
 Border Guard Service of Russia
 Soviet Border Troops
 Federal Security Service of the Russian Federation

References

External links
News from Border Security Zone of Russia (Russian)
Official publications of Border Security Zones limits across the subjects of Russian Federation

Borders of Russia
Foreign relations of the Soviet Union
Military of Russia
Federal Security Service